Idah is a name. It may refer to:

Given name 
 Idah Nabayiga (born 1979), Ugandan politician 
 Idah Nantaba, Ugandan politician
 Idah Peterside (born 1974), Nigerian international football goalkeeper and media officer
 Idah Waringa, Kenyan journalist

Surname 
 Adam Idah (born 2001), Irish professional footballer
 Ovia Idah (1903–1968), Nigerian sculptor, painter, carpenter, designer, and educator
 Rowetta Idah (born 1966), also known as simply Rowetta, British musician

Given names of African origin
Surnames of African origin